Rudy A. Mazzocchi was an American entrepreneur and author. Mazzocchi founded and exited several companies in the med-tech industry including MICROVENA, Vascular Science, Inc., CytoGenesis, Inc. and Image-Guided Neurologics. At his death in 2022, he was Executive Chairman of ONE Exchange AG, Chairman/CEO of AGENTIX Corp., Chairman/CEO of ASEP Medical and former Founding CEO of ELENZA, Executive Chairman of Establishment Labs (NASDAQ:ELSA), Founding Chairman of OptiStent, Inc. and Independent Director of several public and private companies. In 2012, Mazzocchi published the award-winning novel Equity of Evil, the first book of The EQUITY Series. He was the author of over 110 patents. He also served as churchwarden at Manhattan's Little Church Around the Corner.

Early life
Mazzocchi attended the University of Pittsburgh, graduating with a Bachelor of Science in Life Sciences and Biochemistry. He then completed graduate studies in Biophysics at UCLA.

Entrepreneurship
Mazzocchi's first medical start-up was the firm MICROVENA, a producer of medical devices he founded in 1989 as a co-venture with Phillips Plastics. Soon after its founding MICROVENA began operating independently of Phillips, and within four years had over seven million dollars in annual sales. In 1997 groundwork for a potential Microvena IPO led Piper Jaffray to determine that the value of MICROVENA was between $170 million to $185 million. That year Mazzocchi received the inaugural "technology leader" award from Minnesota Technology Inc. Mazzocchi remained CEO until 1998, after which Mazzocchi joined a lawsuit launched by minority shareholders against the majority owners for opting against company expansion and growth into new areas.

While operating MICROVENA, Mazzocchi co-founded the medical company Vascular Science, Inc, where he served on the board of directors. In 1999 the company was sold to St. Jude Medical, in a deal worth $100 million (including $20 million in milestone payments). He next co-founded and served as a director for CytoGenesis, Inc., which was purchased by BresaGen Ltd in 2000. Mazzocchi also co-founded Quasm Inc., and German-based ReStent Therapeutics, Inc. Mazzocchi joined Image-Guided Neurologics, founded by two U of MN physicians and their investors, serving as CEO and president of the firm until the company was purchased by Medtronic, Inc. in 2005. In 2004 Mazzocchi was asked to take the chairmanship of the public company BresaGen when it entered financial trouble. BresaGen was acquired by Hospira Inc for $17.1 million in 2006. Following this he had been chairman and interim CEO of nanotechnology firm Triton BioSystem and then Managing Director for the Atlanta venture capital company Accuitive Medical Ventures. In 2008 Mazzocchi became CEO of NovaVision. Then in 2010 he was named CEO of Elenza. The company is developing the first auto-focusing intraocular lens replacements for people with cataracts and presbyopia. As of 2015, Elenza was in litigation proceedings against Novartis in relation to its technologies. He was also on the Board of Directors of Greatbatch, serving on the Technology Development and Innovation and Corporate Governance and Nominating committees, and has served as a Director of NexGen Medical Systems.

Books
Mazzocchi published the novel Equity of Evil, the first book of The EQUITY Series, medical thrillers based on true events. The book drew off Mazzocchi's experience in medical venture capitalism and was awarded the Global eBook Award for best suspense novel and an eLit award for best suspense/thriller novel. In a 2012 interview with the Seattle Post-Intelligencer, Mazzocchi wrote of the prologue that it "is actually a snap-shot of my work experience in a human genetics lab during my college years as a pre-med student. We were forbidden from discussing what happened there behind those closed doors and it took nearly 30 years for me to eventually 'tell the story'". The book itself is about a new method of abortion that resulted in the pirating of intact human fetuses that became a supply of harvested organs that were grown like hydroponic vegetables to supply the multi-billion dollar black market of human organ transplants.

Mazzochi's follow-up novel Equity of Fear was released in 2013 by Twilight Times Books. Broadway World Books stated that Equity of Fear offered "the same suspense, intensity and international intrigue" as the first installment of the series.

In late 2013, Mazzocchi then released his first non-fiction book STORYTELLING - The Indispensable Art of Entrepreneurism, also published by Twilight Times Books.

Patents
Mazzocchi  authored more than 110 patents, including patents in the fields of cardiology, oncology, orthopedics, neurosurgery, ophthalmology and embryonic stem-cell development. For a few brief examples, in 2001 Mazzocchi was a part of the team that patented a new medical grafting apparatus, granted to St. Jude Medical. In 2003 Mazzocchi authored a patent for a method and apparatus for occluding aneurysms, assigned to AGA Medical Corporation. In 2010 he authored patents for a fiducial marker devices, tools, and methods (awarded to Medtronic, Inc.) and a method and device for filtering body fluid (awarded to ev3 Inc). In 2011 Mazzocchi was named as one of the three inventors of a trajectory guide with angled/patterned guide lumens, given to the University of South Florida.

Awards
Mazzocchi was the recipient of the 2004 Ernst & Young annual Entrepreneur of the Year Award, and received the 2013 Global Entrepreneur of the Year Award by the Business International Group.

References

American technology chief executives
University of Pittsburgh alumni
Living people
Year of birth missing (living people)